The Jack Gibson Cup is a rugby league match contested annually in the National Rugby League between the Parramatta Eels and the Sydney Roosters. The Jack Gibson Cup was introduced in 2008 to commemorate Jack Gibson after his death in the same year.

Results

Chad Robinson medal

The man of the match is awarded the Chad Robinson medal, named after the former Parramatta and Sydney player who died in 2016. Junior Paulo won the medal in 2022.

See also

Parramatta Eels
Sydney Roosters

References

Sydney Roosters
Parramatta Eels
Rugby league competitions in New South Wales
Rugby league in Sydney
Rugby league rivalries
2008 establishments in Australia
Recurring sporting events established in 2008
Sports rivalries in Australia